A riparian zone or riparian area is the interface between land and a river or stream. Riparian is also the proper nomenclature for one of the terrestrial biomes of the Earth. Plant habitats and communities along the river margins and banks are called riparian vegetation, characterized by hydrophilic plants. Riparian zones are important in ecology, environmental resource management, and civil engineering because of their role in soil conservation, their habitat biodiversity, and the influence they have on fauna and aquatic ecosystems, including grasslands, woodlands, wetlands, or even non-vegetative areas. In some regions, the terms riparian woodland, riparian forest, riparian buffer zone, riparian corridor, and riparian strip are used to characterize a riparian zone. The word riparian is derived from Latin ripa, meaning "river bank".

Characteristics
Riparian zones may be natural or engineered for soil stabilization or restoration. These zones are important natural biofilters, protecting aquatic environments from excessive sedimentation, polluted surface runoff, and erosion. They supply shelter and food for many aquatic animals and shade that limits stream temperature change. When riparian zones are damaged by construction, agriculture or silviculture, biological restoration can take place, usually by human intervention in erosion control and revegetation. If the area adjacent to a watercourse has standing water or saturated soil for as long as a season, it is normally termed a wetland because of its hydric soil characteristics. Because of their prominent role in supporting a diversity of species, riparian zones are often the subject of national protection in a biodiversity action plan. These are also known as a "plant or vegetation waste buffer".

Research shows that riparian zones are instrumental in water quality improvement for both surface runoff and water flowing into streams through subsurface or groundwater flow. Riparian zones can play a role in lowering nitrate contamination in surface runoff, such as manure and other fertilizers from agricultural fields, that would otherwise damage ecosystems and human health. Particularly, the attenuation of nitrate or denitrification of the nitrates from fertilizer in this buffer zone is important. The use of wetland riparian zones shows a particularly high rate of removal of nitrate entering a stream and thus has a place in agricultural management. Also in terms of carbon transport from terrestrial ecosystems to aquatic ecosystems, riparian groundwater can play an important role. As such, a distinction can be made between parts of the riparian zone that connect large parts of the landscape to streams, and riparian areas with more local groundwater contributions.

Roles and functions

Riparian zones dissipate stream energy. The meandering curves of a river, combined with vegetation and root systems, slow the flow of water, which reduces soil erosion and flood damage. Sediment is trapped, reducing suspended solids to create less turbid water, replenish soils, and build stream banks. Pollutants are filtered from surface runoff, enhancing water quality via biofiltration.

The riparian zones also provide wildlife habitat, increased biodiversity, and wildlife corridors, enabling aquatic and riparian organisms to move along river systems avoiding isolated communities. Riparian vegetation can also provide forage for wildlife and livestock.

Riparian zones are also important for the fish that live within rivers, such as brook and charr. Impacts on riparian zones can affect fish, and restoration is not always sufficient to recover fish populations.

They provide native landscape irrigation by extending seasonal or perennial flows of water. Nutrients from terrestrial vegetation (e.g. plant litter and insect drop) are transferred to aquatic food webs, and are a vital source of energy in aquatic food webs. The vegetation surrounding the stream helps to shade the water, mitigating water temperature changes. Extreme changes in water temperature can have lethal effects on fish and other organisms in the area. The vegetation also contributes wood debris to streams, which is important to maintaining geomorphology.

From a social aspect, riparian zones contribute to nearby property values through amenity and views, and they improve enjoyment for footpaths and bikeways through supporting foreshoreway networks. Space is created for riparian sports such as fishing, swimming, and launching for vessels and paddle craft.

The riparian zone acts as a sacrificial erosion buffer to absorb impacts of factors including climate change, increased runoff from urbanization, and increased boat wake without damaging structures located behind a setback zone.

Role in logging
The protection of riparian zones is often a consideration in logging operations.  The undisturbed soil, soil cover, and vegetation provide shade, plant litter, and woody material, and reduce the delivery of soil eroded from the harvested area. Factors such as soil types and root structures, climatic conditions, and vegetative cover determine the effectiveness of riparian buffering. Activities associated with logging, such as sediment input, introduction or removal of species, and the input of polluted water all degrade riparian zones.

Vegetation

The assortment of riparian zone trees varies from those of wetlands and typically consists of plants that are either emergent aquatic plants, or herbs, trees and shrubs that thrive in proximity to water.

North America

Water's edge
Herbaceous Perennial: 

Peltandra virginica – Arrow Arum
Sagittaria lancifolia – Arrowhead
Carex stricta – Tussock Sedge
Iris virginica – Southern Blue Flag Iris

Inundated riparian zone
Herbaceous Perennial:

Sagittaria latifolia – Duck Potato
Schoenoplectus tabernaemontani – Softstem Bulrush
Scirpus americanus – Three-square Bulrush
Eleocharis quadrangulata – Square-stem Spikerush
Eleocharis obtusa – Spikerush

Western
In western North America and the Pacific coast, the riparian vegetation includes:

Riparian trees

Sequoia sempervirens – Coast Redwood
Thuja plicata – Western Redcedar
Abies grandis – Grand Fir
Picea sitchensis – Sitka Spruce
Chamaecyparis lawsoniana – Port Orford-cedar
Taxus brevifolia – Pacific Yew
Populus fremontii – Fremont Cottonwood
Populus trichocarpa – Black Cottonwood
Platanus racemosa – California Sycamore
Alnus rhombifolia – White Alder
Alnus rubra – Red Alder
Acer macrophyllum – Big-leaf Maple
Fraxinus latifolia – Oregon ash
Prunus emarginata – Bitter Cherry
Salix lasiolepis – Arroyo Willow
Salix lucida – Pacific Willow
Quercus agrifolia – Coast live oak
Quercus garryana – Garry oak
Populus tremuloides – Quaking Aspen
Umbellularia californica – California Bay Laurel
Cornus nuttallii – Pacific Dogwood

Riparian shrubs

Acer circinatum – Vine Maple
Ribes spp. – Gooseberies and Currants
Rosa pisocarpa – Swamp Rose or Cluster Rose
Symphoricarpos albus – Snowberry
Spiraea douglasii – Douglas spirea
Rubus spp. – Blackberries, Raspberries, Thimbleberry, Salmonberry
Rhododendron occidentale – Western Azalea
Oplopanax horridus – Devil's Club
Oemleria cerasiformis – Indian Plum, Osoberry
Lonicera involucrata – Twinberry
Cornus stolonifera – Red-osier Dogwood
Salix spp. – Willows

Other plants

Polypodium – Polypody Ferns
Polystichum – Sword Ferns
Woodwardia – Giant Chain Ferns
Pteridium – Goldback Ferns
Dryopteris – Wood Ferns
Adiantum – Maidenhair Ferns
Carex spp. – Sedges
Juncus spp. – Rushes
Festuca californica – California Fescue bunchgrass
Leymus condensatus – Giant Wildrye bunchgrass
Melica californica – California Melic bunchgrass
Mimulus spp. – Monkeyflower and varieties
Aquilegia spp. – Columbine

Asia
In Asia there are different types of riparian vegetation, but the interactions between hydrology and ecology are similar as occurs in other geographic areas.

Carex spp. – Sedges
Juncus spp. – Rushes

Australia

Typical riparian vegetation in temperate New South Wales, Australia include:

Acacia melanoxylon – Blackwood
Acacia pravissima – Ovens Wattle
Acacia rubida – Red Stem Wattle
Bursaria lasiophylla – Blackthorn
Callistemon citrinus – Crimson Bottlebrush
Callistemon sieberi – River Bottlebrush
Casuarina cunninghamiana – River She-Oak
Eucalyptus bridgesiana – Apple Box
Eucalyptus camaldulensis – River Red Gum
Eucalyptus melliodora – Yellow Box
Eucalyptus viminalis – Manna Gum
Kunzea ericoides – Burgan
Leptospermum obovatum – River Tea-Tree
Melaleuca ericifolia – Swamp Paperbark

Central Europe
Typical riparian zone trees in Central Europe include:

Acer campestre – Field Maple
Acer pseudoplatanus – Sycamore Maple
Alnus glutinosa – Black Alder
Carpinus betulus – European Hornbeam
Fraxinus excelsior – European Ash
Juglans regia – Persian Walnut
Malus sylvestris – European Wild Apple
Populus alba – White Poplar
Populus nigra – Black Poplar
Quercus robur – Pedunculate Oak
Salix alba – White Willow
Salix fragilis – Crack Willow
Tilia cordata – Small-leaved Lime
Ulmus laevis – European White Elm
Ulmus minor – Field Elm

Repair and restoration
Land clearing followed by floods can quickly erode a riverbank, taking valuable grasses and soils downstream, and later allowing the sun to bake the land dry. Riparian zones can be restored through relocation (of man-made products), rehabilitation, and time. Natural Sequence Farming techniques have been used in the Upper Hunter Valley of New South Wales, Australia, in an attempt to rapidly restore eroded farms to optimum productivity.

The Natural Sequence Farming technique involves placing obstacles in the water's pathway to lessen the energy of a flood, and help the water to deposit soil and seep into the flood zone. Another technique is to quickly establish ecological succession by encouraging fast-growing plants such as "weeds" (pioneer species) to grow. These may spread along the watercourse and cause environmental degradation, but may stabilize the soil, place carbon into the ground, and protect the land from drying. The weeds will improve the streambeds so that trees and grasses can return, and later ideally replace the weeds. There are several other techniques used by government and non-government agencies to address riparian and streambed degradation, ranging from the installation of bed control structures such as log sills to the use of pin groynes or rock emplacement.

See also

 Accropode
 Aquatic ecosystem
 Bioswale
 Bosque
 Canebrake
 Constructed wetland
 Endorheic basin
 Flood-meadow
 Floodplain
 Freshwater swamp forest
 Gallery forest
 Green belt
 Marsh
 Outwelling
 Riparian water rights
 Riparian-zone restoration
 Riprap
 Várzea forest
 Vernal pool
 Vulnerable waters
 Water-meadow
 Wetland

References

Further reading

 
 
Parkyn, Stephanie. (2004). Review of Riparian Buffer Zone Effectiveness. Ministry of Agriculture and Forestry (New Zealand), www.maf.govt.nz/publications.
 
Riparian Bibliography, National Agroforestry Center 
Conservation Buffer Design Guidelines

External links

Riparian Forest Buffers, National Agroforestry Center 
Dissertation on riparian vegetation of Chalakudy River
Restoration strategies for riparian habitats, U.S. military
National Riparian Service Team, Bureau of Land Management
Riparian Habitat Restoration in the Las Vegas Wash
Red River Basin Riparian Project
Riparian Forest Buffers, Kansas State University
 

 
Terrestrial biomes
Environmental conservation
Hydrology
Water streams
Rivers
Habitats
Habitat
Water and the environment
Freshwater ecology